"He Turns It into Love Again" is a song written by Jerry Cheshier, Murry Kellum and Glenn Sutton. It was recorded by American country music artist Lynn Anderson and released as a single in February 1975 via Columbia Records.

Background and release
"He Turns It into Love Again" was recorded at the Columbia Studio, located in Nashville, Tennessee. The sessions was produced by Glenn Sutton, Anderson's longtime production collaborator at the label and her first husband.

"He Turns It into Love Again" reached number 13 on the Billboard Hot Country Singles chart in 1975. It became a minor hit on the Canadian RPM Country Songs chart, reaching number 28 in 1975. The song was issued on Anderson's 1975 studio album, I've Never Loved Anyone More.

Track listings 
7" vinyl single
 "He Turns It into Love Again" – 2:27
 "Someone to Finish What You Started" – 3:12

Chart performance

References

1975 singles
1975 songs
Columbia Records singles
Lynn Anderson songs
Songs written by Glenn Sutton
Song recordings produced by Glenn Sutton